The John Howard Society of Canada is a Canadian non-profit organization that seeks to develop understanding and effective responses to the problem of crime and prison reform. It is named after John Howard, a philanthropist and early English prison reformer. This society works with adults, children, and youths to help rebuild their lives.

History 

The origins of the John Howard Society date back to 1867, with a church group focused on providing spiritual care to prisoners in a Toronto prison. This group became recognized in 1874 as the Prisoners Aid Association of Toronto, soon discovered more was needed the prisoners than the spiritual care they had been providing. Due to decreasing interest, the group became inactive in 1915.

In 1929, Toronto police chief Dennis Draper reactivated the group as the Citizens Service Association after realizing that the conditions prisoners faced upon release were undermining the work of the police. This association was volunteer operated and assisted released prisoners in finding housing, clothing and employment.

The first organization with the John Howard Society name was founded in British Columbia in 1931 by Reverend J. Dinnage Hobden. The society was named after John Howard, an English prison reformer who lived from 1726 to 1790.

In 1946, the Citizens Service Association was renamed the John Howard Society of Ontario. Between 1947 and 1960, most other provinces created their own version of the John Howard Society, and in February 1962, The John Howard Society of Canada was formed when all provinces, excluding Quebec, approved a constitution. Quebec joined in 1980, followed by the Northwest Territories in 1994.

Organization 
John Howard society offices and branches can be found in sixty communities across Canada, in all of the provinces and the Northwest Territories. The John Howard Society has sixty-five offices across Canada which specialize in the reintegration of individuals exiting the prison system back into society. They also work to keep individuals from making decisions that will increase their likelihood of contact with the law. In addition to this, their head office is located in Kingston, Ontario, which is within driving distance of 10 penitentiaries.

The people who comprise the modern John Howard Society have much the same focus as the original groups with a few additions.  For example, advocating for change in the criminal justice process and public education around the issues of prison conditions, criminal law and their application are all newer considerations as society and the criminal justice system change.

In addition to working with people in penitentiaries, Societies today also work with adults and youth in correctional facilities that are either federally and provincially operated. These services offer programming for offenders in custody and in the community and also assist those who have been labeled as "at risk" to continue to live or reintegrate into living "within the law".

See also 
 Canadian Association of Elizabeth Fry Societies

References

External links 
 

Think tanks based in Canada
Prison reform
Prisoner support
1867 establishments in Canada
Organizations established in 1867
Advocacy groups in Canada
Organizations based in Kingston, Ontario
Non-governmental organizations